Frederick W. Truax   (1868 – December 18, 1899) was a Major League Baseball outfielder. He played  for the  Pittsburgh Alleghenys of the National League during the 1890 season.

Sources

Major League Baseball outfielders
Pittsburgh Alleghenys players
Baseball players from Illinois
1868 births
1899 deaths
19th-century baseball players